The Azad Kashmir Police (آزاد کشمیر پولیس)  or Azad Jammu and Kashmir Police (AJKP) is responsible for law enforcement in the Azad Kashmir region administered by Pakistan.  It is headed by Inspector-General of Police, Amir Ahmed Sheikh (PSP), and headquartered in the Central Police Office (CPO) Muzaffarabad, Azad Kashmir.

Unlike the Police Chiefs of other administrative units of Pakistan, the Inspector-General of Azad Jammu and Kashmir Police is usually an officer of (BPS-21), due to the small size of the force.

The mission of the AJK Police is the prevention and detection of crime, maintenance of law and order and enforcement of the Constitution of Pakistan.

Azad Jammu and Kashmir Police consists of 10,000 manpower, responsible for law and order in the 10 districts of the Azad Kashmir. Azad Jammu and Kashmir Police works under the supervision of Home department - Government of Azad Kashmir.

See also
 Law enforcement in Pakistan

References

External links
Official website of the Department of Azad Jammu and Kashmir Police
Official website of the Home Department of Azad Jammu and Kashmir Government

Provincial law enforcement agencies of Pakistan
Government of Azad Kashmir
Azad Kashmir Police